The Pictograph Cave is a prehistoric rock art site near Mountain View, Arkansas.  It consists of a panel of painted art, most of which is abstract wavy lines similar to art found at Petit Jean State Park.  It is one of the furthest-removed expressions of this category of artwork from the Petit Jean area, and was listed on the National Register of Historic Places in 1982 for its information and research potential.

See also
National Register of Historic Places listings in Stone County, Arkansas

References

Archaeological sites on the National Register of Historic Places in Arkansas
National Register of Historic Places in Stone County, Arkansas
Native American history of Arkansas
Rock art in North America